Jordan Foley (born March 9, 1979, in Saint Paul, Minnesota) is an American independent film producer.

Selected filmography

As producer
 Who Are You People (2022) 
 Gossamer Folds (2021) 
 Alone (2020) 
 All Square (2018) 
 Desolate (2018) 
Puncture (2011) 
The Open Road (2009)

As executive producer
 American Woman (2018 film) (2018)

References

External links
 

1979 births
Living people
Businesspeople from Saint Paul, Minnesota
Film producers from Minnesota